Robert "Reggie" McClain (born July 22, 1988) is a former American football cornerback.

McClain was a cornerback, punt returner, and kick returner with the University of Connecticut Huskies.  He was a co-captain in 2009 and was selected as All-Big East Second-team cornerback by the coaches and first-team Big East as a punt returner. He received the Brian Kozlowski Award, named for the former Husky tight end and 13-year NFL veteran. McClain finished his senior season with 60 tackles, four interceptions, three pass breakups and a fumble recovery on defense, and stepped in as the punt returner halfway through the season running back 15 punts for a Big East leading 222 yards and a touchdown. McClain was drafted by the Carolina Panthers in the seventh round of the 2010 NFL Draft.

High school career
McClain was an All-State selection at Patuxent High School in Lusby, Maryland, under head coach Steve Crounse. McClain was named first-team All-Metro by the Washington Post as a cornerback, named All-League as both a running back and a cornerback as a senior and all league cornerback as a junior. He rushed for 1,105 yards and 12 touchdowns, caught 25 passes for 421 yards and four touchdowns, and returned five kickoffs for touchdowns in 2005, one short of the national single season record. McClain also returned a punt 98 yards for a touchdown, intercepted six passes in 2005, broke up 19 others, and made 53 tackles. He attended high school with former UConn tailback Terry Caulley. He attended Eaglecrest High School in Aurora, Colorado in 2002-2003, where he played as a starting running back. He then later attended Patuxent High School for the remainder of his high school career.

College career

2006 season
McClain played in the final seven games on special teams returning 13 kickoffs for an average of 19.0 yards and two punts. He made five tackles in coverage, four of them solo tackles, and was named the Offensive Scout Team Player of the Week on three occasions.

2007 season
McClain played corner back and on special teams in 13 games. He recovered a fumble at Pittsburgh and recorded his first career interception against Maine. He made five tackles at West Virginia, four tackles and an interception in a win over Rutgers, and intercepted an end zone pass in the against University of South Florida. He became a starter in the final regular season game at West Virginia University and was a nickel back for much of the season finishing with 30 tackles (19 solo), three interceptions and three other pass breakups.

2008 season
In the 2008 season, McClain intercepted two Cincinnati passes, returning one for a touchdown to help secure a victory. He started against Syracuse November 15 after an injury to Darius Butler and returned an interception 37 yards for a touchdown. He played in all 13 games with four starts, recorded 30 tackles on the season and led the team in tackles in an International Bowl victory over Buffalo University January 3 with eight (including 3.5 tackles for a loss). He accumulated a total of three interceptions on the season, 5.5 tackles for a loss, five pass breakups, a quarterback hurry.

2009 season
McClain was tied for second best with 4 interceptions in the Big East, was third on his team with 60 tackles in regular season play, and was considered a prospect for the NFL draft. In 10 games he returned 15 punts for 222 yards, an average return of 14.8 yards, including one returned for a touchdown. He also returned two kickoffs for 24 yards. He intercepted 10 passes during his career at UConn.

After a performance in the PapaJohns.com Bowl at Legion Field where McClain was "seemingly was everywhere on defense and special teams Saturday in the Huskies’ 20-7 win over South Carolina", with four tackles, two tackles for losses, three pass breakups breaks up on defense" and impressive punt returns, McClain said he will be trining for a pro football career. "I’m praying to God it happens so I can continue playing football and work hard. Hopefully I get invited somewhere. If it works out, it works out, great. If it doesn’t, it’s the military. I’m going to the Marines. I’ve got to have a plan in case football doesn’t work out." McClain also said he would remember the season, his coaches and his teammate and friend "Jazz" (Jasper Howard) who died in a stabbing during the season for the rest of his life.

Professional career

Carolina Panthers
McClain was drafted in the seventh round, 249 overall pick by the Carolina Panthers in the 2010 NFL Draft. On September 3, 2011, he was released on the day of final roster cuts.

Jacksonville Jaguars
On December 12, 2011, McClain signed with the Jacksonville Jaguars. On December 30, 2011, he was released after the team claimed offensive tackle William Robinson off waivers.

Atlanta Falcons
McClain had a standout season in 2012 for the Atlanta Falcons. After cutting Dunta Robinson, and letting Chris Owens and Brent Grimes walk to the Cleveland Browns and the Miami Dolphins, respectively, in free agency, McClain reprised his role in the nickel spot behind Asante Samuel and Desmond Trufant in 2013. He intercepted Drew Brees in Week 1.

New England Patriots
McClain signed with the New England Patriots on March 18, 2015. He was released by the Patriots on September 5, 2015.

Carolina Panthers (second stint)
On December 15, 2015, McClain re-signed with the Carolina Panthers and became a starter. On February 7, 2016, he was part of the Panthers team that played in Super Bowl 50. In the game, the Panthers fell to the Denver Broncos by a score of 24–10.

McClain was released by the Panthers on December 9, 2016.

San Diego Chargers
McClain was claimed off waivers by the Chargers on December 12, 2016.

Tampa Bay Buccaneers
On May 10, 2017, McClain signed with the Tampa Bay Buccaneers. On September 17, 2017, in Week 2 against the Chicago Bears, he intercepted quarterback Mike Glennon and ran the ball back 47 yards for a touchdown.

NFL statistics

Key
 GP: games played
 COMB: combined tackles
 TOTAL: total tackles
 AST: assisted tackles
 SACK: sacks
 FF: forced fumbles
 FR: fumble recoveries
 FR YDS: fumble return yards 
 INT: interceptions
 IR YDS: interception return yards
 AVG IR: average interception return
 LNG: longest interception return
 TD: interceptions returned for touchdown
 PD: passes defensed

References

External links

Carolina Panthers bio
New England Patriots bio

1988 births
Living people
Players of American football from Philadelphia
American football cornerbacks
UConn Huskies football players
Carolina Panthers players
Jacksonville Jaguars players
Atlanta Falcons players
New England Patriots players
San Diego Chargers players
Los Angeles Chargers players
Tampa Bay Buccaneers players